The 2017–18 Women's LEN Trophy was the 19th edition of the European second-tier tournament for women's water polo clubs. It was contested in Mataró, Spain, on 13 and 14 April 2018.

Dunaújváros achieved the first continental trophy of its history. The Hungarian team won the semifinal against host CN Mataró and the final match against Greece's Olympiacos.

Teams
The tournament was contested by the four teams eliminated from the Euro League's quarterfinals.

|}

Final Four
Mataró was chosen by LEN as host of tournament on 20 March, while the draw was held during Europa Cup's Superfinal, in Pontevedra, on 24 March 2018.

Semifinals

Finals

3rd place

1st place

See also
 2017–18 LEN Euro League Women
 2017–18 LEN Euro Cup

References

External links
Official LEN website
Microplustiming (Official results website)

Women's LEN Trophy seasons
Women
T
T
L
L